Pace Foods is a producer of a variety of canned salsas located in Paris, Texas. The company was founded in 1947 by David Pace when he developed a recipe for a salsa he called "Picante sauce" (picante means 'spicy' in Spanish), which was "made with the freshest ingredients, harvested and hand-selected in peak season to achieve the best flavor and quality". It is now sold as "the Original Picante Sauce".

The Mild and Hot varieties of Pace's Picante sauce were added in 1981 to accompany the original Medium variety. "Thick & Chunky", introduced in 1989, later became "Chunky Salsa". In 1991, Mexican sauces overtook ketchup as the top-selling condiment in the US, with Pace being a leader.  In 1995, the company was acquired by Campbell Soup Company for $1.115 billion.

History 
David Pace grew up in Louisiana, learning the operations of his family's syrup business. He earned a football scholarship to Tulane University, where he played in the first Sugar Bowl in 1937 and earned his undergraduate degree in science. During World War II pilot training school  brought him to San Antonio, Texas, where he returned after his discharge in 1945 and began a career in the food industry.

Pace began his own food business of bottled syrups, as well as jellies and jams. All of these products were made, packed and shipped out of a small space in the back of a liquor store that he and his wife, Margaret, rented. Over time, he expanded the business to a variety of other condiments. In 1947 he decided the real "syrup of the Southwest" was Mexican picante sauce—which is now known as salsa or picante sauce.

Starting with a basic recipe, he experimented with different blends of ingredients. He tested the results on his golf buddies, before settling on one mix of jalapeños, onions and tomatoes. He named his creation "picante" sauce—Spanish for "piquant", meaning "flavorful" or "spicy".

While continuing to sell some 58 assorted condiments, he continued modifying his picante sauce formula for the better part of a decade. As demand grew, Pace dropped the rest of the company's lines and focused on Picante sauce. He marketed Picante sauce to restaurants, using it during his meals, and leaving it behind on the table for other patrons and the restaurant owners to try when he was done.

Picante sauce 

When he started selling his salsa, Pace looked for a supplier for peppers. He tried growing his own jalapeños, but deer would continually eat them, reducing his supply. Eventually, he began buying his peppers directly from local farmers. Later, the company began following the "jalapeño trail", buying from different regions according to the harvest season, before developing their own pepper seeds. Today it uses more than 25 million pounds of jalapeños every year—more than anyone else in the country.

Varieties

In 1981, the company introduced "mild" and "hot" varieties to accompany the original "medium" Picante sauce.  In 1989, Pace Foods added Thick & Chunky salsa to their product line. It is a thicker salsa with larger chunks of vegetables.

The growing demand for picante sauce and salsa reflected the changing demographics of America as well as the increasing popularity of Mexican restaurants and cuisine. Over time, consumers preferences turned toward Mexican foods, such as salsas, and in 1991, Mexican sauces overtook ketchup as the top-selling condiment in the United States in total dollar sales, with Pace Picante sauce and salsa taking the lion's share of the market.

Lines
Pace Foods introduced a new line of specialty salsas in 2008. The specialty salsas include:

 Salsa Verde: Jalapeños and chunks of tomatillos, seasoned with a lime and smoked Spanish paprika.
 Pico De Gallo: Like traditional pico de gallo, with jalapeños, onions, diced tomatoes and cilantro.
 Mexican Four Cheese Salsa Con Queso: With four cheeses—Monterey Jack, Cheddar, Asadero and Queso Blanco, plus jalapeños, red peppers and onion.
Pineapple Mango Chipotle Salsa: Medium-heat salsa with pineapple and mango.  In a chipotle adobo - a tomato sauce made with garlic, onion and smoked jalapeños.
Black Bean & Roasted Corn Salsa: A blend of black beans with fire-roasted corn and red peppers.  With lime and chipotle spice.
New for 2014:

 Pace Fire Mango & Habanero Salsa and Pace Fire Chipotle & Jalapeno Salsa

Awards

Pace Picante Sauce and Salsas took top honors for their categories in Chile Pepper magazine's 2009 Fiery Food Challenge and the 2009 Fiery Foods & BBQ Show's Scovie Awards Competition.  Pace took a total of 12 awards, including first-place awards for Pace Picante sauce - Hot and Pace Salsa Verde.

References

External links
 

Campbell Soup Company brands
Condiment companies of the United States
Linda Pace